Xyloselinum is a genus of flowering plants belonging to the family Apiaceae.

Its native range is Indo-China.

Species:
 Xyloselinum laoticum Pimenov & Aver. 
 Xyloselinum leonidii Pimenov & Kljuykov 
 Xyloselinum vietnamense Pimenov & Kljuykov

References

Apiaceae
Apiaceae genera